The Ford Customline is an automobile model that was sold between 1952 and 1956 by Ford in North America.

First generation (1952–1954)

1952
The Ford Customline was introduced in 1952 as the mid-range model in that year’s US Ford range, positioned below the Ford Crestline and above the Ford Mainline. It was offered in 2-door sedan, 4-door sedan, 2-door coupé & 4-door station wagon body styles. The coupe was marketed as the Club Coupe  and the station wagon as the Customline Country Sedan. 1952 Customlines were available with  inline six-cylinder or  V8 engines. Production totaled 402,542 units.

1953
The 1953 Customlines continued the 1952 bodies with only minor changes. Production totaled 761,662 units.

1954
The 1954 Customlines used the 1952-53 bodies with only minor changes. The Customline range now included a new 2-door Ranch Wagon. Engines were now  inline six-cylinder or   overhead valve V8. 1954 Customline production totaled 674,295 units.

Second generation (1955–1956)

1955
The 1955 Customline was redesigned with new longer, lower and wider bodies. It continued as the mid range trim level, now positioned below the new Ford Fairlane and above the Ford Mainline. It was offered in 2-door sedan and  4-door sedan body styles only, with the wagons now included in their own series which comprised the Ford Ranch Wagon, Ford Country Sedan and Ford Country Squire. Customlines were available with  inline six-cylinder or  V8 engines. 1955 Customline production totaled 471,992 units.

1956
The 1956 Customlines utilized the 1955 bodies with only minor changes. A Customline Victoria 2-door hardtop was added to the range. 1956 Customline production totaled 368,653 units, and was manufactured in several branch assembly plants the company had continued to operate in the United States.

The Customline was not carried over to the 1957 model year.

Australian production
The Customline was also produced by Ford Australia from 1952 to 1959. Cars were assembled using Australian  built bodies and imported chassis kits which included all front sheet metal. In addition to the Customline sedan, a limited number of station wagons  and the Australian developed Mainline Coupe Utility were produced.

The 1952 model was updated in 1953 and 1954 along the lines of the US Fords. All were powered by the Flathead V8 which went into Australian production in 1952. This included the 1954 model which was fitted with the older engine rather than the new overhead valve Y-block V8 which had been introduced in the US for 1954.

The 1955 body was used for four model series in Australia. The 1955 model was powered by the overhead valve Y-block V8 which had entered partial Australian production with locally sourced components. The 1956 model featured the 1956 US Customline grille, 12 volt electrics and a new Fordomatic automatic transmission option. The 1957 model retained the 1956 body but featured a large V8 badge positioned in the grille and utilized 1956 Ford Fairlane trim. The 1958 model used the 1955 Canadian Meteor grille with a four-pointed star and 1956 Meteor side trim. The 1958 ‘star model’ was badged as either a Customline or as a Fordomatic  Production ended in September 1959 with the introduction of Australian assembled 1959 Fairlane 500, Custom 300 and Ranch Wagon models. An estimated 18,000 examples of the 1955-1959 sedan were produced.

See also
 1952 Ford
 1955 Ford

References

Customline
Motor vehicles manufactured in the United States
Cars of Australia